Pertusaria guineabissauensis is a species of crustose lichen in the family Pertusariaceae. It was described as a new species in 2019 by Graciela Paz-Bermúdez, Alan Archer, and John Elix. It grows on tree bark, producing a thick greenish-grey thallus with a dull, wrinkled surface. The lichen is characterised by the presence of wart-shaped (verruciform) ascomata, asci that contain eight ascospores arranged in a single row (uniseriate) and the presence of the secondary chemicals stictic and hypostictic acids. The specific epithet refers to Guinea-Bissau, where the lichen was discovered, and its only known locality.

See also
 List of Pertusaria species

References

guineabissauensis
Lichen species
Lichens described in 2019
Lichens of Guinea-Bissau
Taxa named by Alan W. Archer
Taxa named by John Alan Elix